Kvalsund is a village in Hammerfest Municipality in Troms og Finnmark county, Norway. It was formerly the administrative centre of Kvalsund Municipality.

The village is located on the mainland, along the Kvalsundet strait, at the mouth of the river Kvalsundelva.  The village sits just east of the Kvalsund Bridge which connects the mainland to the island of Kvaløya, just to the north.  Kvalsund Church is located in this village.

References

Villages in Finnmark
Hammerfest
Populated places of Arctic Norway